Noah Nicholas Beery (January 17, 1882 – April 1, 1946) was an American actor who appeared in films from 1913 until his death in 1946. He was the older brother of Academy Award-winning actor Wallace Beery as well as the father of prominent character actor Noah Beery Jr. He was billed as either Noah Beery or Noah Beery Sr. depending upon the film.

Early life
Noah Nicholas Beery was born on a farm in Clay County, Missouri, not far from Smithville. The Beery family left the farm in the 1890s and moved to nearby Kansas City, Missouri, where the father was employed as a police officer. While still a young boy Beery got his first exposure to theatre, and at the same time showed budding entrepreneurship by selling lemon drops at the Gillis Theater in Kansas City.

Beery's deep, rich voice in his early teens led several actors at the Gillis Theater to encourage him to take singing lessons and consider a career as a performer. A summer of singing at Kansas City's Electric Park amusement park led to his leaving for New York City at age 16. Beery was three years older than his brother Wallace, who also became an actor as quickly as he could.

Career

 
Beery worked in vaudeville and in the choruses of musical comedies during his early years in New York. Soon, though, he turned to acting in melodramas of the period, often under the direction of William A. Brady.

After a dozen years on the stage, he joined his brother Wallace in Hollywood in 1915 to make motion pictures. He became a respected character actor, adept at playing the villain but sometimes portraying the hero. One of his most memorable characterizations was as Sergeant Gonzales in The Mark of Zorro (1920) opposite Douglas Fairbanks. The tagline on the poster for Stormswept (1923) proclaimed "Wallace and Noah Beery, The Two Greatest Character Actors on the American Screen".

Beery acted through the silent film era, and made the transition to "talkies". He appeared in early Technicolor musicals, such as The Show of Shows (1929), the widescreen musical Song of the Flame (1930; the movie's poster noted that "Noah Beery will thrill you with his wonderful bass voice, twice as low as any ever recorded"), Bright Lights (1930), Under a Texas Moon (1930) and Golden Dawn (1930; in which he wore blackface as an African native).

He reached his peak in popularity in 1930, recording a phonograph record for Brunswick Records with songs from two of his films. However, his popularity gradually declined while his brother Wallace became the highest-paid actor in the world, winning an Oscar and arranging a contract with MGM in which he would be paid $1 more than any other actor on their roster. Noah Beery Sr. played the flamboyant supporting role of Mae West's bar-owning lover until she leaves him for Cary Grant in She Done Him Wrong (1933), while his brother Wallace performed in an extremely similar part, as the top-billed lead, later the same year in Raoul Walsh's The Bowery.

At the height of his career, Noah Beery began billing himself as "Noah Beery Sr." in anticipation of his son's presence in films. After his death, his son dropped the "Junior" and became simply Noah Beery. Among other films, Noah Beery Sr. and Noah Beery Jr. appeared together in The Trail Beyond (1934) with John Wayne, in which Noah Jr. played Wayne's sidekick throughout the picture. Four decades later, Noah Jr. became best known as James Garner's character's father "Rocky" in the 1970s television series The Rockford Files. Noah Beery Sr. appeared in nearly 200 films during his career and in 1945 returned to New York City to star in the Mike Todd Broadway production of Up in Central Park.

Personal life
Beery married actress Marguerite Walker Lindsey in 1910. Their first child died in infancy. Their second child, actor Noah Lindsey Beery (stage name Noah Beery Jr.), was born in 1913 and was seriously ill in early childhood, prompting a brief move to Florida on the advice of doctors.

Death
Beery died on April 1, 1946, aged 64, after suffering a heart attack at the Beverly Hills home of his brother Wallace Beery. It was Wallace's birthday and, in addition to celebrating the event, the brothers were rehearsing a radio drama they were scheduled to perform later in the evening.

He was buried at Forest Lawn Memorial Park, Hollywood Hills in Los Angeles.

Selected filmography

 The Influence of a Child (1913, Short) as Jim Cooper - a Crook
 The Social Highwayman (1916) as Hugh Jaffray
 The Human Orchid (1916)
 The Spirit of '76 (1917) as George Washington
 A Mormon Maid (1917) as Darius Burr
 Sacrifice (1917) as Count Wenzel
 The Chosen Prince, or The Friendship of David and Jonathan (1917) as Saul
 The Hostage (1917) as Boyadi
 The Clever Mrs. Carfax (1917) as Adrian Graw
 Molly Entangled (1917) as Shawn, the Smithy
 His Robe of Honor (1918) as 'Boss' Nordhoff
 The Hidden Pearls (1918) as Teariki
 The Whispering Chorus (1918) as Longshoreman
 The White Man's Law (1918) as Dr. Robinson
 Old Wives for New (1918) as Doctor (uncredited)
 Social Ambition (1918) as Big Dan Johnson
 Believe Me, Xantippe (1918) as Sheriff Kamman
 Less Than Kin (1918) as Senor Cortez
 The Source (1918) as John Nord
 The Goat (1918) as Cowboy (uncredited)
 Too Many Millions (1918) as R.A. Bass
 The Squaw Man (1918) as Tabywana
 Under the Top (1919) as Prof. De Como
 Johnny Get Your Gun (1919) as Town Marshal
 The Red Lantern (1919) as Dr. Sam Wang
 The Woman Next Door (1919) as Randolph Schuyler
 A Very Good Young Man (1919) as Blood
 Louisiana (1919) as Lem Rogers
 The Valley of the Giants (1919) as Black Minorca
 In Mizzoura (1919) as Jo Vernon
 Everywoman (1919) as Bluff
 The Sagebrusher (1920) as Sim Gage
 The Fighting Shepherdess (1920) as Mormon Joe
 The Sea Wolf (1920) as 'Wolf' Larsen, the Sea Wolf
 Go and Get It (1920) as Dr. Ord
 Love Madness (1920) as Jack Frost
 The Scoffer (1920) as Boorman
 The Mutiny of the Elsinore (1920) as Andreas Mellzire
 Dinty (1920) as Wong Tai
 The Mark of Zorro (1920) as Sergeant Pedro Gonzales
 Why Tell? (1921)
 Bob Hampton of Placer (1921) as Red Slavin
 Beach of Dreams (1921) as Jack Raft
 Bits of Life (1921) as Hindoo
 The Call of the North (1921) as Galen Albret
 Lotus Blossom (1921) as Tartar Chief
 Tillie (1922) as Jacob Getz
 Wild Honey (1922) as Henry Porthen
 Belle of Alaska (1922) as Wade Harkin
 The Lying Truth (1922) as Lawrence De Muidde
 The Heart Specialist (1922) as Dr. Thomas Fitch
 The Crossroads of New York (1922) as James Flint
 I Am the Law (1922) (with Wallace Beery) as Sgt. Georges Mordeaux
 Flesh and Blood (1922) as Li Fang (with Lon Chaney)
 The Power of Love (1922) as Don Almeda
 Youth to Youth (1922) as Brutus Tawney
 Good Men and True (1922) as S.S. Thorpe
 Ebb Tide (1922) as Richard Attwater
 Omar the Tentmaker (1922) (with Boris Karloff) as The shah of shahs
 Dangerous Trails (1923) as Insp. Criswell
 The Spider and the Rose (1923) as Maître Renaud
 Stormswept (1923) (with Wallace Beery) as Shark Moran
 Quicksands (1923) as 'Silent' Krupz
 Main Street (1923) as Adolph Valborg
 Soul of the Beast (1923) as Caesar Durand
 Wandering Daughters (1923) as Charle Horton
 The Spoilers (1923) (with Milton Sills and Anna Q. Nilsson) as Alex McNamara
 Tipped Off (1923) as Chang Wo
 Hollywood (1923, Cameo) as himself
 The Destroying Angel (1923) as Curtis Drummond
 To the Last Man (1923) as Colter
 His Last Race (1923) as Packy Sloane
 When Law Comes to Hades (1923)
 Desire (1923) as Hop Lee
 Stephen Steps Out (1923) as Muley Pasha
 The Call of the Canyon (1923) as Haze Ruff
 The Heritage of the Desert (1924) as Holderness
 The Fighting Coward (1924) as Capt. Blackie
 Wanderer of the Wasteland (1924) as Dismukes
 Welcome Stranger (1924) as Icabod Whitson
 Lily of the Dust (1924) (with Pola Negri and Ben Lyon) as Col. Mertzbach
 The Female (1924) (with Betty Compson and Warner Baxter) as Barend de Beer
 North of 36 (1924) (with Jack Holt and Lois Wilson) as Slim Rudabaugh
 The Spaniard (1925) as Gómez
 East of Suez (1925) as British Consul
 Folly of Youth (1925) as Lee Haynes
 Contraband (1925) (with Lois Wilson) as Deputy Jenney
 The Thundering Herd (1925) (with Jack Holt, Charles Ogle and Tim McCoy) as Randall Jett
 Old Shoes (1925) as The Stepfather
 The Light of Western Stars (1925) as Brand
 Wild Horse Mesa (1925) as Bud McPherson
 The Coming of Amos (1925) as Ramón Garcia
 The Vanishing American (1925) (with Richard Dix) as Booker
 Lord Jim (1925) (with Raymond Hatton) as Captain Brown
 The Enchanted Hill (1926) as Jake Dort
 The Crown of Lies (1926) as Count Mirko
 Padlocked (1926) as Henry Gilbert
 Beau Geste (1926) (with Ronald Colman, William Powell, and Victor McLaglen) as Sgt. Lejaune
 Paradise (1926) as Quex
 Evening Clothes (1927) as Lazarre
 The Rough Riders (1927) (with George Bancroft and Mary Astor) as Hell's Bells
 The Love Mart (1927) (with Boris Karloff) as Capt. Remy
 The Dove (1927) as Don José María y Sandoval
 Beau Sabreur (1928) as Sheikh El Hammel
 Two Lovers (1928) as The Duke of Azar
 Hellship Bronson (1928) as Capt. Ira Bronson
 The Godless Girl (1928) as The Brute
 The Passion Song (1928) as John Van Ryn
 Noah's Ark (1928) as Nickoloff / King Nephiliu
 Dreary House (1928)
 Love in the Desert (1929) as Abdullah
 Linda (1929) as Armstrong Decker
 False Fathers (1929) as Parson
 Careers (1929) as The President
 The Four Feathers (1929) as Slave Trader
 The Isle of Lost Ships (1929) as Captain Peter Forbes
 Two O'Clock in the Morning (1929)
 The Show of Shows (1929) (with John Barrymore, Mary Astor, Myrna Loy and Loretta Young) as Performer in "The Pirate" Number / Soldier (segment "Rifle Execution")
 Glorifying the American Girl (1929) as himself (uncredited)
 Isle of Escape (1930) as Shane
 Under a Texas Moon (1930) as Jed Parker
 Murder Will Out (1930) as Lt. Concon
 Show Girl in Hollywood (1930) as himself at Premiere (uncredited)
 Song of the Flame (1930) as Konstantin
 Golden Dawn (1930) as Shep Keyes
 Oh, Sailor Behave! (1930) as Romanian General
 The Way of All Men (1930) as Stratton
 Big Boy (1930) as Bagby
 Bright Lights (1930) as Miguel Parada
 The Love Trader (1930) as Captain Morton
 Renegades (1930) as Thurman Machwurth
 A Soldier's Plaything (1930) as Capt. Plover
 Tol'able David (1930) as Luke
 The Millionaire (1931) as Peterson
 Honeymoon Lane (1931) as Tom Baggott
 The Homicide Squad (1931) as Captain Buckley
 Shanghaied Love (1931) as Captain 'Black Yankee' angus Swope
 Riders of the Purple Sage (1931) (with George O'Brien and Marguerite Churchill) as Judge Dyer
 In Line of Duty (1931) as Jean Duchene
 The Drifter (1932) (with William Farnum) as John McNary
 The Stoker (1932) as Santini
 Stranger in Town (1932) as J.B. Hilliker
 Cornered (1932) as Laughing Red Slavens
 No Living Witness (1932) as Clyde Corbin
 Out of Singapore (1932) as 1st Mate Woolf Barstow
 The Big Stampede (1932) (with John Wayne) as Sam Crew
 The Devil Horse (1932, Serial) as Canfield
 The Kid from Spain (1932) as Alonzo Gomez
 Long Loop Laramie (1932)
 She Done Him Wrong (1933) (with Mae West and Cary Grant) as Gus Jordan
 The Thundering Herd (1933) (with Randolph Scott, Buster Crabbe and Harry Carey) as Randall Jett
 The Flaming Signal (1933) as Otto Von Krantz
 Sunset Pass (1933) (with Randolph Scott and Harry Carey) as Marshal Blake
 The Woman I Stole (1933) as Gen. Rayon
 Easy Millions (1933) with Richard "Skeets" Gallagher
 Fighting with Kit Carson (1933, Serial) as Cyrus Kraft
 Laughing at Life (1933) as Hauseman
 Man of the Forest (1933) (with Randolph Scott, Harry Carey and Buster Crabbe) as Clint Beasley
 To the Last Man (1933) (with Randolph Scott, Esther Ralston and Buster Crabbe) as Jed Colby
 Caravan (1934) as Innkeeper
 Madame Spy (1934) as General Philipow
 David Harum (1934) as General Woolsey
 Mystery Liner (1934) as Capt. John Holling
 Cockeyed Cavaliers (1934) as Baron Moxford
 Happy Landing (1934) as Capt. Terris
 The Trail Beyond (1934) (with John Wayne and Noah Beery Jr.) as George Newson
 Kentucky Kernels (1934) as Colonel Wakefield
 Sweet Adeline (1934) as Sultan in the Show (uncredited)
 King of the Damned (1935) as Mooche
 The Crimson Circle (1936) as Felix Marl
 The Avenging Hand (1936) as Lee Barwell
 Someone at the Door (1936) as Harry Capel
 The Prisoner of Corbal (1936) as The Sergeant
 Strangers on a Honeymoon (1936) as Redbeard
 I Live Again (1936) as Morton Meredith
 The Frog (1937) as Joshua Broad
 Our Fighting Navy (1937) as The Presidente of Bianco
 Zorro Rides Again (1937) as J. A. Marsden
 The Bad Man of Brimstone (1937) (with Wallace Beery) as Ambrose Crocker
 The Girl of the Golden West (1938) as The General
 Panamint's Bad Man (1938) as King Gorman
 Mexicali Rose (1939) as Pedro Valdez
 Mutiny on the Blackhawk (1939) as Captain of the 'Blackhawk'
 Pioneers of the West (1940) as Judge Platt
 Grandpa Goes to Town (1940) as Sam
 Adventures of Red Ryder (1940, Serial) (with Don 'Red' Barry) as Ace Hanlon
 The Tulsa Kid (1940) as Montana Smith
 A Little Bit of Heaven (1940) as Uncle Sherm
 A Missouri Outlaw (1941) as Sheriff Ben Dixon
 The Devil's Trail (1942) as Bull McQuade
 Isle of Missing Men (1942) as Capt. Sanchez (uncredited)
 Overland Mail (1942, Serial with Lon Chaney Jr. and Noah Beery Jr.) as Frank Chadwick
 Outlaws of Pine Ridge (1942) as Honest John Hollister
 Pardon My Gun (1942) as Judge W. B. Hackett (uncredited)
 Tennessee Johnson (1942) (with Van Heflin) as Sheriff Cass
 Carson City Cyclone (1943) as Judge Phalen
 Clancy Street Boys (1943) as Pete Monahan
 Salute to the Marines (1943, in color with Wallace Beery) as Adjutant
 Mr. Muggs Steps Out (1943) as Judge
 Million Dollar Kid (1944) as Captain Mathews
 Block Busters (1944) as Judge
 Barbary Coast Gent (1944 with Wallace Beery and Chill Wills) as Pete Hanibal
 Gentle Annie (1944) as Hansen
 This Man's Navy (1945 with Wallace Beery) as Joe Hodum
 Sing Me a Song of Texas (1945) (with Tom Tyler) as Charley Bronson (final film role)

References

External links

1937 film interview with Noah Beery
 

 
 Literature on Noah Beery

1882 births
1946 deaths
Male actors from Kansas City, Missouri
People from Clay County, Missouri
American male film actors
American male silent film actors
American male stage actors
20th-century American male actors
Burials at Forest Lawn Memorial Park (Hollywood Hills)
Male Western (genre) film actors